Cinepazic acid is a cinnamoyl-piperazine. Its derivatives include the vasodilators cinepazide and cinepazet.

References

Acetic acids
Pyrogallol ethers
Piperazines